The 1961–62 Eintracht Frankfurt season was the 62nd season in the club's football history. In Oberliga Süd the club played in the Oberliga Süd, then one of many top tiers of German football. It was the club's 17th season in the Oberliga Süd.
Eintracht finished the league as runners-up. In the German Championship Qualifiers the Eagles finished as 2nd.

Matches

Legend

Friendlies

Oberliga Süd

League fixtures and results

League table

Results summary

Results by round

German football championship

League fixtures and results

League table

Results summary

Results by round

DFB-Pokal / SFV-Pokal

DFB-Pokal

SFV-Pokal

Squad

Squad and statistics

|}

Transfers

In:

Out:

Sources 

 German archive site

See also
 1962 German football championship

External links
 Official English Eintracht website 

1961-62
German football clubs 1961–62 season